Éric N'Gapeth (born 17 July 1959 in Douala, Cameroon) is a French former volleyball player and coach who competed at the 1988 Summer Olympics. He is the father of volleyball player Earvin N'Gapeth, who currently plays for France national volleyball team.

References 

Olympic volleyball players of France
Volleyball players at the 1988 Summer Olympics
Sportspeople from Douala
1959 births
Living people
Cameroonian emigrants to France
French men's volleyball players